Thiourea dioxide or thiox is an organosulfur compound that is used in the textile industry. It functions as a reducing agent. It is a white solid, and exhibits tautomerism.

Structure
The structure of thiourea dioxide depends on its environment. Crystalline and gaseous thiourea dioxide adopts a structure with C2v symmetry. Selected bond lengths: S-C = 186, C-N = 130, and S-O = 149 pm. The sulfur center is pyramidal. The C-S bond length is more similar to that of a single bond. For comparison, the C=S bond in thiourea is 171 pm. The long C-S bond indicates the absence of C=S character. Instead the bonding is described with a significant contribution from a dipolar resonance structure with multiple bonding between C and N. One consequence of this bonding is the planarity of the nitrogen centers. In the presence of water or DMSO, thiourea dioxide converts to the tautomer, a sulfinic acid, (H2N)HN=CS(O)(OH), named formamidine sulfinic acid.

Synthesis
Thiourea dioxide was first prepared in 1910 by the English chemist Edward de Barry Barnett.

Thiourea dioxide is prepared by the oxidation of thiourea with hydrogen peroxide.
(NH2)2CS + 2H2O2 → (NH)(NH2)CSO2H + 2H2O
The mechanism of the oxidation has been examined. An aqueous solution of thiourea dioxide has a pH about 6.5 at which thiourea dioxide is hydrolyzed to urea and sulfoxylic acid. It has been found that at pH values of less than 2, thiourea and hydrogen peroxide react to form a disulfide species. It is therefore convenient to keep the pH between 3 and 5 and the temperature below 10 °C. It can also be prepared by oxidation of thiourea with chlorine dioxide. The quality of the product can be assessed by titration with indigo.

Uses
Thiourea dioxide is used in reductive bleaching in textiles. Thiourea dioxide has also been used for the reduction of aromatic nitroaldehydes and nitroketones to nitroalcohols.

References

Sulfinic acids
Thioureas
Amidines
Reducing agents
Substances discovered in the 1910s